Scott Bernard Amedure (January 26, 1963 – March 9, 1995) was a bartender from Lake Orion, Michigan, who was fatally shot twice on March 9, 1995, by his acquaintance Jonathan Schmitz. Three days prior to the shooting, Amedure and Schmitz filmed an episode of the tabloid talk show The Jenny Jones Show; titled "Revealing Same Sex Secret Crush", Amedure, a 32-year-old gay man, publicly revealed to Schmitz, a 24-year-old straight man, that Amedure was his secret admirer. Following this appearance, Schmitz confronted Amedure and shot him twice in the chest. He confessed to the killing and was found guilty of second-degree murder. The Amedure family sued The Jenny Jones Show for wrongful death, although the show was ultimately found to not be liable. Amedure and Schmitz's appearance on The Jenny Jones Show was shelved, although it was later shown to jurors during the latter's trial.

Early life
Amedure was born in 1963 in Pittsburgh, Pennsylvania, and grew up in Lake Orion, Michigan.  He served in the army, where he came out as gay.

Appearance on The Jenny Jones Show 
On March 6, 1995, Amedure was a guest on an episode of The Jenny Jones Show titled "Revealing Same Sex Secret Crush", in which he admitted to being a secret admirer of Jonathan Schmitz, who lived near him in Lake Orion, Michigan.  Until the taping, Schmitz did not know who would be revealed as his secret admirer. Schmitz stated that he participated in the show due to curiosity, and he claimed later that the producers implied that his admirer was a woman, although the producers of the show claim that they did tell Schmitz that the admirer could be male or female.

During the segment, Amedure was encouraged by Jones to share his fantasies about Schmitz, after which Schmitz was brought onstage.  According to The Washington Post, "[t]he two men exchanged an awkward embrace before the host dropped her bombshell."  In response to Amedure's disclosure, Schmitz laughed, then stated that he was "definitely heterosexual".

Aftermath and murder 
According to footage of the murder trial, it was stated later by a friend of Amedure's that Amedure and Schmitz went out drinking together the night after the taping and an alleged sexual encounter occurred. According to the testimony at the murder trial, three days after the taping, Amedure left a "suggestive" note at Schmitz's house. After finding the note, Schmitz withdrew money from a bank, purchased a shotgun, and then went to Amedure's mobile home. He then asked Amedure if he was the one that left the note. According to court documents, Amedure responded with a smile. Schmitz then returned to his car, got his gun, and returned to Amedure's trailer. He then shot Amedure twice in the chest, killing him. After killing Amedure, Schmitz left the residence, telephoned 9-1-1, and confessed to the killing.

Trial and sentencing of Schmitz 

At trial, defense attorneys argued that Schmitz, who had been diagnosed with manic depression (bi-polar disease) and Graves' disease, was caused to commit homicide by mental illness and humiliation, by way of the "gay panic defense". Schmitz was found guilty of second-degree murder in 1996 and sentenced to 25–50 years in prison, but his conviction was overturned on appeal. Upon retrial, he was found guilty of the same charge once again and his sentence was reinstated. Schmitz was released from prison on August 22, 2017, after being granted parole.

Trial of the show producers 
In 1999, the Amedure family, retaining Geoffrey Fieger as lawyer, sued The Jenny Jones Show, Telepictures, and Warner Bros. for the ambush tactics and, as the Amedure family considered it, their negligent actions that resulted in Amedure's death. In May, the jury awarded the Amedures $29,332,686.

The jury found that The Jenny Jones Show was both irresponsible and negligent, contending that the show intentionally created an unpredictable situation without due concern for the possible consequences.  Time Warner's defense attorney later claimed the verdict would cause a "chilling effect" on the industry.

The judgment was later overturned by the Michigan Court of Appeals in a 2-to-1 decision. The Michigan Supreme Court declined to hear the case.

Media coverage 
The podcast Criminal included the murder of Scott Amedure and following trial of Jonathan Schmitz in their episode "Panic Defense" about the gay panic defense.

The Jenny Jones controversy was also covered as the first episode in the Netflix series Trial by Media.

In 2021, the controversy was covered in season 6 of the series How It Really Happened on the US TV network HLN in an episode titled "The Jenny Jones Show: Fatal Attraction".

See also 
 List of homicides in Michigan
 Homophobia
 Murder of Larry King

References

External links 
 Court Opinion – Majority Authored Published
 Court Opinion – Dissenting
 Overthrown due to Bias
 Several articles regarding the Appeals Court Ruling from The Oakland Press
 Equality Michigan – LGBT Rights Organization
 
 Jonathan Schmitz at the Michigan Dept. of Corrections

1963 births
1995 deaths
1995 in LGBT history
1995 in Michigan
1995 murders in the United States
American murder victims
Gay men
People from Pittsburgh
People murdered in Michigan
Deaths by firearm in Michigan
Burials in Michigan
March 1995 events in the United States
March 1995 crimes
Violence against gay men in the United States
Violence against men in North America
LGBT history in Michigan
male murder victims